Syed Maqsood (born 11 March 1975) is an Indian-born cricketer who played for the United Arab Emirates national cricket team. He made his debut in One Day Internationals against the Indian cricket team at the Rangiri Dambulla International Stadium.

1975 births
Living people
Emirati cricketers
United Arab Emirates One Day International cricketers
Indian emigrants to the United Arab Emirates
Indian expatriate sportspeople in the United Arab Emirates